To the Limit may refer to:
 To the Limit (1989 film), an IMAX documentary
 To the Limit (1995 film), a 1995 American action film
 To the Limit, or Al límite, a 1997 Spanish film starring Juanjo Puigcorbé
 To the Limit (2007 film), a 2007 German film
 To the Limit (album), a 1978 album by Joan Armatrading
 To the Limit, a 1993 album from Whitecross
 "To the Limit" (song), a 2012 song by KAT-TUN

See also
 Take It to the Limit (disambiguation)